Operation Ostfront  (German: "Eastern Front") was the sortie into the Arctic Ocean by the German battleship  during World War II. This operation culminated in the sinking of Scharnhorst.

Background
Soon after the German invasion of the Soviet Union, Arctic Convoys were sent by the Western Allies to the Soviet Union delivering vital supplies.

By December 1943 the tide had turned against Germany. The Battle of the Atlantic had been lost, and supplies poured into the United Kingdom and the Soviet Union.

The Operation
In November 1943 the Arctic Convoys restarted. On 19 December 1943 Grand Admiral Karl Dönitz submitted a request to Hitler to allow Scharnhorst to attack the next convoy sailing through the Barents Sea. On 25 December 1943 Dönitz ordered Ostfront to commence. Admiral Fraser (C-in-C of the Home Fleet), alerted by Norwegian resistance information to the possibility of an interception by Scharnhorst, prepared a trap for the German warship. On 25 December Scharnhorst sailed to intercept the British convoy, JW 55B, believing it to be sparsely protected. 
In the ensuing Battle of the North Cape Scharnhorst was separated from her escorting destroyers and was sunk.

References

 Operation Ostfront

North Cape
Arctic naval operations of World War II
Arctic convoys of World War II